The Simple Life is an American sitcom television series starring Judith Light which aired on CBS from June 3 until July 8, 1998. The series stars Judith Light as a Martha Stewart-like TV star, who decides to move her TV show from Manhattan to a rustic farm in upstate New York.

Premise
Judith Light stars in the series as Sara Campbell, the host of her own cooking show, who decides to leave Manhattan and move her show to a country farm. A divorcée, Sara moves her daughter Freddi and mother Muriel to rural upstate New York to live what she preaches — a simpler life. But as they soon learn, life there is anything but simple. Sara finds herself in constant conflict with foreman Luke Barton, who is raising his late sisters' son and daughter nearby.

CBS tried another show similar in content earlier in 1998 titled Style & Substance, starring Jean Smart as a lifestyle expert. It was cancelled after 5 episodes, while 7 more episodes were aired during the summer.

The Simple Life was co-created and produced by Prudence Fraser and Robert Sternin, who were then also producing the hit sitcom The Nanny for CBS as well. Sara was introduced as a former classmate of that series' lead character Fran Fine (Fran Drescher) and her sidekick Val Toriello (Rachel Chagall). They appeared in the pilot, while Fran's mother Sylvia (Renée Taylor) appeared in a separate episode.

Cast
Judith Light as Sara Campbell (née Lipschitz)
Brett Cullen as Luke Barton, the foreman at Sara's farm.
Florence Stanley as Muriel Lipschitz, Sara's mother.
James Patrick Stuart as Greg Champlain, Sara's producer.
Ashlee Levitch as Frederica "Freddi" Campbell, Sara's daughter.
Ross Malinger as Will Barton, Luke's orphaned nephew.
Eliza Dean as Charlotte Barton, Luke's orphaned niece.

Recurring
Sara Rue as Melanie, an obsessive fan of Sara's who becomes her assistant.
Vasili Bogazianos as Nick, the stage manager of Sara's show
Jeff Blumenkrantz as Jeff
 Matthew Perry    as John

Notable Guest Stars
Fran Drescher as Fran Fine, Sara's high school classmate. ("Pilot")
Rachel Chagall as Val Toriello, Sara's high school classmate. ("Pilot")
Beverly Garland as Other Mother ("The Other Mother")
Renée Taylor as Sylvia Fine ("The Other Mother")
Jay Thomas as Joel Campbell, Sara's ex-husband ("Sara's Ex")
Joseph Bologna as Philip Devine, the president of the network Sara's show airs on. ("The Luke & Sara Show")

Episodes

References

External links
 
  

1998 American television series debuts
1998 American television series endings
1990s American sitcoms
English-language television shows
CBS original programming
Television series by Sony Pictures Television
Television shows set in New York (state)
Television series about television